The Caminhos do Cinema Português is the only festival of exclusively Portuguese cinema, held in Portugal. It is a project of the "Centro de Estudos Cinematográficos" (Centre for Cinematographic Study) of the Associação Académica de Coimbra. It is considered the sixth film festival of Portugal, and one of the few festivals held outside the greater Lisbon and greater Oporto areas. The festival takes place annually in November in the city of Coimbra and reached its nineteenth  season .

Awards

Grande Prémio do Festival
18th Caminhos do Cinema Português: Blood of My Blood

References

External links 
 Official website

Film festivals in Portugal
Events in Coimbra
Annual events in Portugal
Autumn events in Portugal